Muppakoil is a village in the Kumbakonam taluk of Thanjavur district, Tamil Nadu, India.

Demographics 

As per the 2001 census, Muppakoil had a total population of 342 with 160 males and 182 females. The sex ratio was 1136. The literacy rate was 86.75

References 

 

Villages in Thanjavur district